The list of symphonies in G-sharp minor includes:

Symphony in G-sharp minor by Elliot Goldenthal
 by Nikolai Myaskovsky
An early abandoned work by Marc Blitzstein

See also
List of symphonies by key

G sharp minor (section)
Symphonies